Mikhalevo is a rural locality (a village) in Kubenskoye Rural Settlement, Kharovsky District, Vologda Oblast, Russia. The population was 14 as of 2002.

Geography 
Mikhalevo is located 23 km northwest of Kharovsk (the district's administrative centre) by road. Gora is the nearest rural locality.

References 

Rural localities in Kharovsky District